Jason "Jake" Logue (born November 15, 1972) is a former American football quarterback who played one season with the Memphis Pharaohs of the Arena Football League. He played college football at Mesa State College.

References

External links
Just Sports Stats

Living people
1972 births
Players of American football from Colorado
American football quarterbacks
Colorado Mesa Mavericks football players
Memphis Pharaohs players
People from Adams County, Colorado